Helston Castle was a medieval castle built for Edmund, 2nd Earl of Cornwall in the late 13th-century, in Helston, Cornwall. The castle was ruined by the end of the 15th century, and sat at the bottom of Coinagehall Street, where the bowling green and Grylls Monument are now located. Although very little is known about the castle, it is speculated that the castle was a fortified manor house.

Background
Edmund, 2nd Earl of Cornwall was the grandson of King John, and a wealthy magnate who served as regent for his cousin King Edward I. As Earl of Cornwall, he controlled eight and a third of Cornwall's nine hundreds, and had an income of around £8,000 per year (the equivalent of roughly £ in 2019).

Helston is a town in south-west Cornwall, England. It was granted a town charter by King John in 1201, and gained further status during Edward I's reign, when it became a stannary town which returned two members of parliament.

History and location
The castle was built sometime in the late 13th century for Edmund. There is speculation regarding the function of the castle; Charles Henderson said that it was a fortified manor house. The location of the site, overlooking the river valley, which at the time was accessible from the sea, has also led to suggestions that it was more defensive in nature. By the time of William Worcester's visit in 1478, the castle was in ruins, while another fifty years later, John Leland recorded that there were only traces of the castle remaining. In David J Cathcart King's index of British castles, he records Helston Castle as a "vanished castle".

The former site of the castle is now the location of a bowling green and the Grylls Monument, at the bottom of Coinagehall Street.

Notes

References

Castles in Cornwall
Helston
Former buildings and structures in Cornwall